Shadow of a Face is a monument to abolitionist Harriet Tubman in Newark, New Jersey's Harriet Tubman Square designed by architect and artist Nina Cooke John. It was unveiled on March 9, 2023. It is one of several monuments in the park, and replaced a monument to Christopher Columbus in the same location which was removed in 2020 by the city to prevent its toppling in a Black Lives Matter protest.

Design 
The design is governed in plan by circles, which symbolize community connection across time and space, according to Cooke John. The monument is made of a curved poured-in-place concrete wall with a six foot tall bas-relief of Tubman's face on the side facing the Newark Museum of Art and a mosaic of blue tiles made by community members on the other. A second curved wall made of wood slats on the exterior and corten steel on the interior contains a timeline of Tubman's life as well as panels that present information on Black liberation history in the city and state. A 25-foot tall black steel silhouette of Tubman rises from the monument's interior. An abstracted cape made of black steel and plastic conduit floats over the wood slat wall. There is one bench made of concrete and wood slats in the monument's interior and one on the exterior. The outline of Columbus's plinth is inscribed in the ground.

Integrated speakers play audio narrating Tubman's life by Newark native Queen Latifah and reflections from community members. Lights within the silhouette and in the ground light up the monument at night. Signs on a steel electricity box explain the monument and the park's history.

The name of the work was inspired by "Runagate Runagate"  a 1962 Robert Hayden poem which references Tubman.

History 
In October 2020, Mayor of Newark, Ras Baraka, said that the city would replace the monument to Columbus with one to Harriet Tubman with the City of Newark commissioning five local artists to present proposals to a 14-person jury. In June 2021, the city announced the selection of Cooke John to complete the monument.

Community members have disputed Tubman's connection to Newark and the decision to rename the park in her honor. Some have also criticized the removal of Columbus without a public hearing and as erasing an important part of American history.

The monument was originally rejected by a state historic preservation panel (the park and statue of Columbus are contributing properties to the James Street Commons Historic District) for not adequately consulting with the area's Italian community and asked to be presented with a plan that included statues to both Columbus and Tubman, but the panel was subsequently overruled by a state commissioner.

The project is a Grace Farms Design for Freedom pilot project, meaning it was produced with forced labor-free materials.

The monument was unveiled on March 9, 2023, by Mayor Ras Baraka, First Lady of New Jersey Tammy Murphy, Queen Latifah, Cooke John, Don Katz and other local dignitaries following a press conference at Audible's Innovation Cathredral.

See also
List of public art in Newark, New Jersey

References

External links
Bloomberg Philathropics Not Just a Statue: A New Monument Rooted in Community and History in Newark, NJ February 25, 2022
Arch paper Five finalists

Monuments and memorials
Statues in New Jersey
Monuments and memorials in New Jersey
Public art in Newark, New Jersey
Memorials to Harriet Tubman